The Kalimpong subdivision is the sole subdivision of the Kalimpong district in the state of West Bengal, India. It was initially formed as a subdivision of the Darjeeling district in 1916 under British India. On 14 February 2017 the subdivision was promoted to a district, becoming an independent Kalimpong district. The subdivision has its headquarters at Kalimpong Town and consists of the hilly areas annexed from Bhutan at the end of the Anglo-Bhutanese War in 1865.

Subdivision
Kalimpong district has only one administrative subdivision:

{{OSM Location map
| width=450| height=280| zoom=10
| coord=| float=right|caption=Places in the Kalimpong subdivisionCT: census town,  R: rural/ urban centre, M: municipality, F: facility, NP: national parkAbbreviations used in names – TG for Tea Garden (town/village)Owing to space constraints in the small map, the actual locations in a larger map may vary slightly
|mark-coord1=| label-pos1=right|label1= Algarah| numbered1=R| mark-title1= Algarah (R)|label-color1= #800000 |label-size1=11| mark-size1=12|shape1=l-circle|shape-color1= #C42222|shape-outline1=white|label-offset-x1=2
|mark-coord2=| label-pos2=left|label2=Bhalukhop| numbered2=R| mark-title2= Bhalukhop (R)
|mark-coord3=| label-pos3=right|label3=Bich Kagay| numbered3=R| mark-title3= Bich Kagay (R)
|mark-coord4=| label-pos4=left|label4=Bindu| numbered4=R| mark-title4= Bindu, Kalimpong (R)
|mark-coord5=| label-pos5=left|label5=Gorubathan| numbered5=R| mark-title5= Gorubathan (R)
|mark-coord6=| label-pos6=right|label6=Icche Gaon| numbered6=R| mark-title6= Icche Gaon (R)
|mark-coord7=| label-pos7=right|label7=Jaldhaka| numbered7=R| mark-title7= Jaldhaka (R)
|mark-coord8=| label-pos8=right|label8=Jhalong| numbered8=R| mark-title8= Jhalong (R)
|mark-coord9=| label-pos9=left|label9=Kumai TG| numbered9=R| mark-title9= Kumai Tea Garden (R)
|mark-coord10=| label-pos10=left|label10=Lava| numbered10=R| mark-title10= Lava, West Bengal (R)
|mark-coord11=| label-pos11=left|label11=Loleygaon| numbered11=R| mark-title11= Loleygaon (R)
|mark-coord12=| label-pos12=right|label12=Lower Fagu TG| numbered12=R| mark-title12= Lower Fagu Tea Garden (R)
|mark-coord13=| label-pos13=right|label13=Mongpong| numbered13=R| mark-title13= Mongpong (R)
|mark-coord14=| label-pos14=right|label14= Kalijhora| numbered14=R| mark-title14= Kalijhora (R)
|mark-coord15=| label-pos15=right|label15= Pedong| numbered15=R| mark-title15= Pedong (R)
|mark-coord16=| label-pos16=left|label16= Ramdhura| numbered16=R| mark-title16= Ramdhura (R)
|mark-coord17=| label-pos17=bottom|label17= Rambi Bazar| numbered17=R| mark-title17= Rambi Bazar (R)
|mark-coord18=| label-pos18=right|label18= Rishyap| numbered18=R| mark-title18= Rishyap (R)
|mark-coord19=| label-pos19=left|label19= Rongo| numbered19=R| mark-title19= Rongo, Kalimpong (R)
|mark-coord20=| label-pos20=bottom|label20= Samabiyong TG| numbered20=R| mark-title20= Samabiyong Tea Garden (R)
|mark-coord21=| label-pos21=left|label21= Sillery Gaon| numbered21=R| mark-title21= Sillery Gaon (R)
|mark-coord22=| label-pos22=left|label22= Suntalekhola| numbered22=R| mark-title22= Suntalekhola (R)
|mark-coord23=| label-pos23=top|label23= Teesta Bazaar| numbered23=R| mark-title23= Teesta Bazaar (R)
|mark-coord24=| label-pos24=left|label24= Todey|labela24= Tangta| numbered24=R| mark-title24= Todey Tangta (R)
|mark-coord25=| label-pos25=left|label25= Nimbong| numbered25=R| mark-title25= Nimbong (R)
|mark-coord26=| label-pos26=left|label26= Kolakham| numbered26=R| mark-title26= Kolakham (R)
|mark-coord27=| label-pos27=left|label27= Mansong| numbered27=R| mark-title27= Mansong (R)
|mark-coord28=| label-pos28=right |label28=Kalimpong| numbered28=M| mark-title28= Kalimpong (M)| shape-color28=#800000
|mark-coord29=| label-pos29=right|label29=Dungra| numbered29=CT| mark-title29= Dungra, Kalimpong (CT) |shape-color29= #A40000
|mark-coord30= | label-pos30=top|label30= Dr. Graham's Homes| numbered30=F| mark-title30= Dr. Graham's Homes (F) |shape-color30=#967117
|mark-coord31=| label-pos31=bottom|label31=Neora Valley |labela31= National Park| numbered31=NP| mark-title31= Neora Valley National Park (NP)| shape-color31=#228B22
|mark-coord32=|label32= Teesta |labela32=River| label-color32 = #77A1CB| label-angle32=75| label-pos32=top| label-size32=10| mark-size32=0| mark-title32=none
|mark-coord33=|label33= Jaldhaka River| label-color33 = #77A1CB| label-angle33=85| label-pos33=top| label-size33=10| mark-size33=0| mark-title33=none
|mark-coord34=| label34= Teesta Low|labela34= Dam IV| label-color34 = #C42222 | label-angle34=0| label-pos34=right| label-size34=10| mark-size34=12| numbered34=D|mark-title34 =Teesta Low Dam - IV Hydropower Plant| shape-color34=#C42222
|mark-coord35=| label35= Teesta Low|labela35= Dam III| label-color35 = #C42222 | label-angle35=0| label-pos35=right| label-size35=10| mark-size35=12| numbered35=D|mark-title35 =Teesta Low Dam - III Hydropower Plant| shape-color35=#C42222
|arc-coordA=|arc-textA= SIKKIM| arc-text-colorA=hard grey| arc-angleA=-50| arc-gapA=3.5| arc-radiusA=0.4
|arc-coordB=|arc-textB= BHUTAN| arc-text-colorB=hard grey| arc-angleB=50| arc-gapB=3.5| arc-radiusB=0.4}}

Administrative areas
Apart from the Kalimpong municipality that consists of 23 wards, the subdivision contained rural areas of 42 gram panchayats. , these areas divided under four community development blocks: Kalimpong–I, Lava, Pedong, and Gorubathan. Prior to the bifurcation in 2021, Lava and Pedong blocks constituted a single block termed Kalimpong–II.

Gram Panchayats
 Kalimpong I block consists of rural areas with 18 gram panchayats, viz. Bong, Kalimpong, Samalbong, Tista, Dr. Grahams Homes, Lower Echhay, Samthar, Neembong, Dungra, Upper Echhay, Seokbir, Bhalukhop, Yangmakum, Pabringtar, Sindepong, Kafer Kanke Bong, Pudung and Tashiding. 

Kalimpong II block (now Lava and Pedong blocks) consists of rural areas only with 13 gram panchayats, viz. Dalapchand, Kashyong, Lolay, Lingseykha, Gitdabling, lava-Gitabeong, Payong, Kagay, Lingsey, Sangsay, Pedong, Syakiyong and Shantook. 

Gorubathan block consists of rural areas only with 11 gram panchayats, viz. Dalim, Gorubathan–I, Gorubathan–II, Patengodak, Todey Tangta, Kumai, Pokhreybong, Samsing, Aahaley, Nim and Rongo.

Police stations
Police stations in the Darjeeling Sadar subdivision have the following features and jurisdiction: 

 
Blocks
Community development blocks in Siliguri subdivision are:

Education
Given in the table below (data in numbers) is a comprehensive picture of the education scenario in Kalimpong district, with data for the year 2012-13.

Educational institutions
The following institutions are located in Kalimpong subdivision:

Kalimpong College, established in 1962 at Kalimpong, offers undergraduate courses in arts, science and commerce.
Cluny Women's College, established in 1998 at Kalimpong, offers undergraduate courses in arts, computer applications and commerce.
Government General Degree College, Pedong was established in 2015 at Pedong. It offers undergraduate courses in arts and science.
Government General Degree College, Gorubathan was established in 2015 at Gorubathan. It offers undergraduate courses in arts and science.
Rockvale Management College was established in 2012 at Kalimpong. Affiliated with the West Bengal University of Technology it offers courses in computer application, business administration and travel & tourism management.

Healthcare
The table below (all data in numbers) presents an overview of the medical facilities available and patients treated in the hospitals, health centres and sub-centres in 2013 in Kalimpong district, with data for the year 2012-13.:

.* Excluding nursing homes.

Medical facilities
Medical facilities in Kalimpong subdivision are as follows:Hospitals: (Name, location, beds) 
Kalimpong Subdivisional Hospital, Kalimpong M, 370 beds
Medicinal Plantation Hospital, Rango, 11 beds
Mansong Cinchona Plantation Hospital, Mansong, 16 bedsRural Hospitals: (Name, CD block, location, beds)
Rambi Rural Hospital, Kalimpong I CD block, Rambi Bazar, PO Reang, 30 beds
Pedong Rural Hospital, Kalimpong II CD block, Pedong, 30 bedsBlock Primary Health Centres: (Name, CD block, location, beds)

Gorubathan Block Primary Health Centre, Gorubathan CD block, Gorubathan, PO Fagu, 25 bedsPrimary Health Centres ''': (CD block-wise)(CD block, PHC location, beds)
Kalimpong I CD block: Samthar Samalbong (Samthar) (6), Teesta Bazaar (10)
Kalimpong II CD block: Gitdubling (6), Algarah (2)
Gorubathan CD block: Jaldhaka (2), Shirpagaon (2)

Legislative segments
As per order of the Delimitation Commission in respect of the delimitation of constituencies in the West Bengal, the whole are under the subdivision, viz. the Kalimpong municipality and the three blocks of Kalimpong–I, Kalimpong–II and Gorubathan together constituted the Kalimpong assembly constituency of West Bengal. This constituency was part of Darjeeling Lok Sabha constituency.

References

Bibliography
 

Subdivisions of West Bengal
Subdivisions in Kalimpong district